16S rRNA (cytosine1407-C5)-methyltransferase (RNA m5C methyltransferase YebU, RsmF, YebU) is an enzyme with systematic name S-adenosyl-L-methionine:16S rRNA (cytosine1407-C5)-methyltransferase. This enzyme catalyses the following chemical reaction

 S-adenosyl-L-methionine + cytosine1407 in 16S rRNA  S-adenosyl-L-homocysteine + 5-methylcytosine1407 in 16S rRNA

The enzyme specifically methylates cytosine1407 at C5 in 16S rRNA.

References

External links 
 

EC 2.1.1